The 1910 New South Wales state election was held on 14 October 1910 for all of the 90 seats in the 22nd New South Wales Legislative Assembly and it was conducted in single-member constituencies with a second ballot if a majority was not achieved on the first. Both adult males and females were entitled to vote, but not Indigenous people. The 21st parliament of New South Wales was dissolved on 14 September 1910 by the Governor, Lord Chelmsford, on the advice of the Premier Charles Wade.

This was the first NSW election using a second ballot system. All previous elections had used a first past the post voting system, where a candidate might be elected with less than 50% of the vote especially where two or more similar candidates split the vote. There were 3 districts that required a second ballot, at Durham and St Leonards where the second round ballot was won by the leading candidate and at Hastings and Macleay where support from the Labour Party saw the independent overtake the sitting Liberal Reform member to take the seat.

The election saw the Labor Electoral League form government for the first time, winning 46 of the 90 seats in the Assembly.

Key dates

Results

{{Australian elections/Title row
| table style = float:right;clear:right;margin-left:1em;
| title        = New South Wales state election, 14 October 1910
| house        = Legislative Assembly
| series       = New South Wales state election
| back         = 1907
| forward      = 1913
| enrolled     = 867,695
| total_votes  = 572,500
| turnout %    = 69.05
| turnout chg  = +2.33
| informal     = 10,514
| informal %   = 1.80
| informal chg = −1.07
}}

|}

Changing seats

The Upper Hunter had been won by William Fleming (Liberal Reform) at the 1907 election, however he resigned to contest the seat of New England at the 1910 federal election. The by-election in April 1910 was won by William Ashford (Labor) however Henry Willis regained the seat for Liberal Reform at the general election.

See also
 Candidates of the 1910 New South Wales state election
 Members of the New South Wales Legislative Assembly, 1910–1913

Notes

References

1910 New South Wales state election
1910 elections in Australia
1910 New South Wales state election
October 1910 events